Rishworth railway station was a railway station on the Rishworth Branch, built by the Lancashire & Yorkshire Railway, to serve the village of Rishworth in Calderdale, West Yorkshire, England. It opened in 1881 and closed to passenger services in 1929; goods traffic ceased in 1953.

A planned extension of the line towards  was never built.

None of the buildings are still standing intact, however, some station remains can be seen on the overgrown site, as well as the platform.

References

External links 
 Rishworth station on navigable 1947 O. S. map

Disused railway stations in Calderdale
Former Lancashire and Yorkshire Railway stations
Railway stations in Great Britain opened in 1881
Railway stations in Great Britain closed in 1929
1881 establishments in England
Ripponden